Aguibou Camara (born 20 May 2001) is a Guinean professional footballer who plays as an attacking midfielder or a winger for Greek Super League club Atromitos, on loan from Olympiacos and the Guinea national team.

Club career
On 29 March 2019, Camara signed his first professional contract with Lille in France, with the deal lasting for five years. He made his professional debut in a Coupe de France match against Dijon on 10 February 2021, and scored in the 15th minute of the game.

On 13 July 2021, he joined Olympiacos. The 20-year-old joined the Greek giants from Lille in the summer, having only played once for the reigning Ligue 1 champions. The Guinea international has quickly forced himself into Pedro Martins' plans. On 6 August 2021, he scored his first goal with the club against PFC Ludogorets Razgrad, as a late substitute, helping Olympiacos to avoid overall defeat at Karaiskaki Stadium in the first match of the third qualifying round of 2021–22 UEFA Champions League qualifying phase and play-off round.
On 17 October 2021, he opened the score in a 2–1 away win against PAS Giannina and a week later he opened the score in a 2−1 home derby game against rivals PAOK, being the main protagonist of the match. On 21 November, he opened the scoring in a triumphant 3−2 away win against rivals AEK. On 6 February 2022, he opened the score in a 3-0 away win against Ionikos F.C.

International career
A youth international for Guinea, Camara represented the Guinea U20s for the 2019 Africa U-20 Cup of Nations qualification matches. He made his senior debut for Guinea in a 1–0 friendly loss to the Comoros on 12 October 2019. On 21 December 2021, was called up for the 2021 Africa Cup of Nations.

Career statistics

Club

Honours

Club
Olympiacos
Super League Greece: 2021–22

Individual
IFFHS CAF Youth Men's Team of the Year: 2021

References

External links
 
 

2001 births
Living people
Guinean footballers
Guinea international footballers
Lille OSC players
Ligue 1 players
Championnat National 2 players
Olympiacos F.C. players
Super League Greece players
Association football midfielders
Guinean expatriate footballers
Expatriate footballers in France
Guinean expatriate sportspeople in France
Expatriate footballers in Greece
Guinean expatriate sportspeople in Greece
2021 Africa Cup of Nations players